Branko Rašović (born 11 April 1942) is a Montenegrin football defender who played for SFR Yugoslavia. His son Vuk is also a retired professional footballer, and former head coach of FK Partizan.

Club career

Budućnost Titograd
Rašović began with football in Budućnost Titograd as a center half. Even as a young player he excelled and received calls for youth  selections of the Yugoslavia national football team.

In the 1961–62 season, he managed with his club Buducnost to qualify for the Yugoslav First League. He played the 1962–63 season in the first league, but Buducnost was again relegated to second division. The next season, he got a call from FK Partizan and in the 1964–65 season he played again in first league competition but this time for FK Partizan.

Partizan
Rašović played five years in Partizan, from 1964 until 1969. In the first season, 1964–65, he gained a place in the starting eleven and won the title of champion of Yugoslavia. In that season, he played seventeen league games for Partizan. In total, he played 210 games and scored two goals for Partizan. At the international level he played for Partizan in 39 games and scored one goal. Crown of his career was the 1966 European Cup Final in Brussels, when Partizan played in the final against Spanish champions Real Madrid CF. They played at the famous Heysel Stadium in front of 55,000 spectators. Partizan was equal rival in everything and in the 55 minute Velibor Vasović scored the leading goal. Unfortunately for Partizan players, that was all they could do. With two goals of Amancio Amaro and Fernando Serena, Real managed to defeat Partizan and Real took the title of European champion.

Borussia Dortmund
In 1969, Rašović went to the German first league team Borussia Dortmund. Borussia played the next three seasons in the German top-flight Bundesliga. But after that, they were relegated and in the next two seasons, 1972–73 and 1973–74, they played in the German Regionalliga West. It was also the last season of his active professional career. Rašović spent five seasons in Dortmund and played 78 first league matches and 30 games in the Regionalliga. In total he played 109 league games for Borussia.

International career
Rašović made his debut for the senior national team of Yugoslavia on 1 April 1964, in a friendly match against Bulgaria. The match was played at the stadium of FK Radnicki Nis, popularly called Cair. 10,000 people attended the game and Yugoslavia won with 1–0. Rašović ended his career in national team on 7 October 1967, in a UEFA Euro 1968 qualification match against Germany. The match was played in Hamburg in front of 70,573 spectators and ended with Germany winning 3–1.

Despite this defeat, Yugoslavia qualified for the European Championship and recorded one of its greatest successes, playing the second time in its history in the European Championship finals. Rašović was capped ten times for Yugoslavia.

He has earned a total of 10 caps, scoring no goals. His final international was an October 1967 European Championship qualification match against West Germany.

References

External links

 Branko Rašović at the website of the Football Association of Montenegro  
 
 Branko Rašović at the Serbian federation website 

1942 births
Living people
Footballers from Podgorica
Association football defenders
Yugoslav footballers
Yugoslavia international footballers
FK Budućnost Podgorica players
FK Partizan players
Borussia Dortmund players
Yugoslav First League players
Bundesliga players
Yugoslav expatriate footballers
Expatriate footballers in West Germany
Yugoslav expatriate sportspeople in Germany
FK Partizan non-playing staff